In mathematics and Fourier analysis, a rectangular mask short-time Fourier transform (rec-STFT) has the simple form of short-time Fourier transform. Other types of the STFT may require more computation time than the rec-STFT.

The rectangular mask function can be defined for some bound (B) over time (t) as

 

We can change B for different tradeoffs between desired time resolution and frequency resolution.

Rec-STFT

 

Inverse form

Property
Rec-STFT has similar properties with Fourier transform
 Integration
(a)
 

(b)
 
Shifting property (shift along x-axis)

 

Modulation property (shift along y-axis)

special input
When 
When 

Linearity property
If ,and are their rec-STFTs, then

 

 Power integration property

 
 

 Energy sum property (Parseval's theorem)

Example of tradeoff with different B

From the image, when B is smaller, the time resolution is better. Otherwise, when B is larger, the frequency resolution is better.

Advantage and disadvantage
Compared with the Fourier transform:

 Advantage: The instantaneous frequency can be observed.
 Disadvantage: Higher complexity of computation.

Compared with other types of time-frequency analysis:

 Advantage: Least computation time for digital implementation.
 Disadvantage: Quality is worse than other types of time-frequency analysis. The jump discontinuity of the edges of the rectangular mask results in Gibbs ringing artifacts in the frequency domain, which can be alleviated with smoother windows.

See also

 Uncertainty principle

References

 Jian-Jiun Ding (2014) Time-frequency analysis and wavelet transform

Fourier analysis
Time–frequency analysis
Transforms